"Prescription for Death" is the first episode of the long-running crime drama television series Law & Order. It aired on September 13, 1990 on NBC. Although it was the first episode of the series to air, it is not the pilot.  The pilot episode, "Everybody's Favorite Bagman", which was filmed two years prior to the rest of the first season, aired as the sixth episode. "Prescription for Death" is based upon the death of Libby Zion.

Plot
Suzanne Morton dies after a visit to a hospital emergency room during a hectic night shift. Her father (John Spencer), a former medic in Vietnam, accuses the hospital of negligence and demands a police investigation. Logan and Greevey question a doctor who made adjustments to her chart, but are soon led to the respected Dr. Edward Auster, whom they feel might have been drunk on duty. The other residents are reluctant to speak for fear of putting their jobs in jeopardy, and Stone is faced with the awkward job of prosecuting a revered physician.

References

External links

Law & Order episodes
1990 American television episodes
American television series premieres